The Inkigayo Chart is a music program record chart that gives an award to the best-performing single of the week in South Korea. The chart measured digital performance in domestic online music services (55%), social media via YouTube views (35%), network on-air time (10%), advanced viewer votes (5%), and album sales (5%) in its ranking methodology.

In 2018, there were 30 singles that ranked number one on the chart and 21 music acts received award trophies for this feat. 10 songs collected trophies for three weeks and earned a Triple Crown: Twice's "Heart Shaker", "What Is Love?", and "Dance the Night Away"; iKon's "Love Scenario"; Mamamoo's "Starry Night"; BTS's "Fake Love" and "Idol"; Blackpink's "Ddu-Du Ddu-Du"; IU's "Bbibbi"; and Jennie's "Solo".

iKon's third consecutive win with "Love Scenario" granted the group its first Triple Crown since its debut. Musician Paul Kim earned his first award with "Me After You" despite a lack of promotional activities on music shows. Jennie made her debut performance as a soloist on the November 25 broadcast of Inkigayo, where she won her first music show award with "Solo".

Chart history

References 

2018 in South Korean music
2018 record charts
Lists of number-one songs in South Korea